The 2011 Estoril Open was a tennis tournament played on outdoor clay courts. It was the 22nd edition of the Estoril Open for the men (the 15th for the women), and was part of the ATP World Tour 250 series of the 2011 ATP World Tour, and of the International-level tournaments of the 2011 WTA Tour. Both the men's and the women's events took place at the Estádio Nacional in Oeiras, Portugal, from 23 April through 1 May 2011.

ATP entrants

Seeds

 Seedings are based on the rankings of April 18, 2011.

Other entrants
The following players received wildcards into the main draw:
  Gastão Elias
  João Sousa
  Jo-Wilfried Tsonga

The following players received entry from the qualifying draw:

  Flavio Cipolla
  Frederik Nielsen
  Édouard Roger-Vasselin
  Pedro Sousa

WTA entrants

Seeds

 Seedings are based on the rankings of April 18, 2011.

Other entrants
The following players received wildcards into the main draw:
  Maria João Köhler
  Magali de Lattre
  Bárbara Luz

The following players received entry from the qualifying draw:

  Beatriz García Vidagany
  Tamira Paszek
  Sloane Stephens
  Anastasiya Yakimova

Finals

Men's singles

 Juan Martín del Potro defeated  Fernando Verdasco, 6–2, 6–2
It was del Potro' 2nd title of the year and 9th of his career.

Women's singles

 Anabel Medina Garrigues defeated  Kristina Barrois, 6–1, 6–2.
It was Medina Garrigues' 1st title of the year and 10th of her career.

Men's doubles

 Eric Butorac /  Jean-Julien Rojer defeated  Marc López /  David Marrero, 6–3, 6–4.

Women's doubles

 Alisa Kleybanova /  Galina Voskoboeva defeated  Eleni Daniilidou /  Michaëlla Krajicek, 6–4, 6–2.

External links
 Official website

Portugal Open
Estoril Open
Estoril Open
Estoril Open
 Estoril Open